The Seehorn (2,439 m) is a mountain of the Swiss Pennine Alps, overlooking Gondo in the canton of Valais. Unlike most other mountains in Valais, the Seehorn lies on the south side of the Alps, in the southern Simplon Valley.

From the Furggu pass (1,872 m) a trail leads to its summit.

References

External links
 Seehorn on Hikr

Mountains of the Alps
Mountains of Switzerland
Mountains of Valais
Two-thousanders of Switzerland